Service is a surname. Notable people with the surname include:

 Elman Service (1915–1996), American anthropologist
 James Service (1823–1899), Australian politician
 James E. Service (1931–2017), American admiral
 John S. Service (1909–1999), American diplomat
 Robert Service (historian) (born 1947), British historian
 Robert W. Service (1874–1958), Canadian poet
 Scott Service (born 1967), American baseball player
 Tom Service (born 1976), British music journalist and radio and television presenter